The 1962 NAIA men's basketball tournament was held in March at Municipal Auditorium in Kansas City, Missouri. The 25th annual NAIA basketball tournament featured 32 teams playing in a single-elimination format. It would be the last tournament without a formal leading scorer and rebounder awards presented. This was also the first tournament since seeding began to feature the top two teams in the Championship Game. The number 2 seeded Prairie View A&M (Texas) beat Westminster (Pa.) 62 to 53.

Awards and honors
Many of the records set by the 1962 tournament have been broken, and many of the awards were established much later:
Leading scorer: est. 1963
Leading rebounder: est. 1963
Player of the Year: est. 1994
Most rebounds; tournament: 96, Zelmo Beaty, Prairie View A&M (Texas)
Most rebounds; career start: 180, Lucious Jackson, Pan American (Texas), (1962,  1963, 1964)
All-time leading scorer; first appearance: Lucious Jackson 7th, Pan American (Texas) (1962,63,64), 12 games, 117 field goals, 67 free throws, 301 total points, 25.0 average per game.

1962 NAIA bracket

  * denotes overtime.

Third-place game
The third-place game featured the losing teams from the national semifinalist to determine 3rd and 4th places in the tournament. This game was played until 1988.

See also
 1962 NCAA University Division basketball tournament
 1962 NCAA College Division basketball tournament

References

NAIA Men's Basketball Championship
Tournament
NAIA men's basketball tournament
NAIA men's basketball tournament